Schick may refer to:

 Schick (razors), a brand of safety razors

People
 Alfredo Catalán Schick (born 1968), current mayor of El Hatillo Municipality in Venezuela
 Allen Schick, professor of political science
 Béla Schick (1877–1967), Hungarian-born American pediatrician, known for the Schick test
 Conrad Schick (1822–1901), German architect, archaeologist and Protestant missionary
 Doyle Schick (1939–2001), former American football cornerback in the National Football League
 Eliezer Shlomo Schick (1940–2015), Hasidic rabbi
 Franz Schick (born 1960), retired German football forward
 George Schick (1908–1985), Czechoslovakian conductor, vocal coach, accompanist, and music educator
 George V. Schick (died 1964), American Lutheran biblical scholar and translator of Martin Luther
 Gerhard Schick (born 1972), German politician
 Gottlieb Schick (1776–1812), German painter
 Henry Schick, pioneer barn-builder of Idaho
 Jacob Schick (1877–1937), Inventor of dry shaving
 Lawrence Schick, game designer and writer associated with role-playing games
 Ludwig Schick (born 1949), Roman Catholic bishop of Fulda and archbishop of Bamberg
 Marion Schick (born 1958), German manager, politician and professor
 Marjorie Schick (1941–2017), American jewelry artist and academic
 Marvin Schick, former Hunter College and New School for Social Research political-science and constitutional law professor
 Michael Schick (born 1988), German footballer
 Morrie Schick (1892–1979), American baseball player
 Moshe Schick (1807–1879), Hungarian rabbi
 Patrik Schick (born 1996), professional Czech football forward
 René Schick Gutiérrez (1909–1966), President of Nicaragua from 1963 to 1966
 Robert Schick (born 1993), German footballer
 RoseAnna Schick, Canadian entertainment publicist
 Steven Schick (born 1954), musician
 Thomas Schick (born 1969), German mathematician, see List of International Congresses of Mathematicians Plenary and Invited Speakers
 Theodore Schick, author in the field of philosophy
 Thorsten Schick (born 1990), Austrian footballer

See also 
 Schick test, a test to determine susceptibility to diphtheria
 Shick (disambiguation)